Anthony Heidrich (born 25 June 1968) is an Australian cricketer. He played in one List A match for South Australia in 1993/94.

See also
 List of South Australian representative cricketers

References

External links
 

1968 births
Living people
Australian cricketers
South Australia cricketers
Cricketers from Adelaide